Huayang may refer to:

 Ancient name of the Sichuan region, including Chongqing and Hanzhong
 Chronicles of Huayang
 Huayang County, former county in Sichuan, now part of Shuangliu
 Huayang Auto